James Sharkey is the name of:

Jim Sharkey (1934–2014), Scottish footballer
James A. Sharkey (born 1945), Irish historian and diplomat